Oleksandr Kovpak (born 2 February 1983 in Smila, Cherkasy Oblast, Ukrainian SSR) is a retired Ukrainian footballer and current manager of LNZ Cherkasy.

Career
He moved to Tavriya in the winter of 2005 from Dnipro Cherkassy.

Kovpak become the top goalscorer of the Ukrainian Premier League 2008-09 with Tavriya, having netted 17 goals.

The head coach of Ukraine's national team Oleksiy Mykhailychenko called him into the Ukrainian squad for the 2010 World Cup qualifying games versus Croatia and Kazakhstan on 6 June 2009 and 10 June 2009 respectively, but he remained an unused substitute for these matches. He finally made his debut on 2 June 2013, in the 0:0 draw with Cameroon in a friendly match after coming on as a late replacement for Roman Zozulya. With all three games, he spent on the pitch a total of 14–15 minutes.

During the winter break of the 2010–11 Ukrainian Premier League season he transferred to 
Arsenal Kyiv.

Career statistics

References

External links
Profile on Official Tavriya website 

1983 births
Living people
Ukrainian footballers
People from Smila
FC Dnipro Cherkasy players
SC Tavriya Simferopol players
FC Arsenal Kyiv players
FC Sevastopol players
FC Vorskla Poltava players
Ukrainian Premier League players
Ukrainian First League players
Ukrainian Second League players
Ukraine international footballers
Ukraine under-21 international footballers
Ukrainian Cup top scorers
Ukrainian Premier League top scorers
FC Cherkashchyna players
Association football forwards
FC Poltava players
FC Desna Chernihiv players
FC Chornomorets Odesa players
FC Polissya Zhytomyr players
FC LNZ Cherkasy players
Sportspeople from Cherkasy Oblast
Ukrainian football managers